Sasso di Castalda is a town and comune within the province of Potenza, in the region of Basilicata, Italy.

Notes

Cities and towns in Basilicata